United States v. Kirby Lumber Co., 284 U.S. 1 (1931), was a case in which the United States Supreme Court held that when a corporation settles its debts for less than the face amount, a taxable gain has occurred.

Facts & procedural history
In 1923, the Kirby Lumber Company issued bonds which had a par value of $12,126,800.  Later that same year, the company repurchased the same bonds in the open market for a sum less than par value. The difference between the issue price of the bonds and the price at which the company repurchased them was $137,521.30. The regulations promulgated by the United States Department of the Treasury stated that such a cost savings to a corporation was to be considered taxable income. The Court of Claims, however, found in favor of the taxpayer, analogizing the situation in this case to the one in Bowers v. Kerbaugh-Empire Co., 271 U.S. 170 (1925), a case in which a loan repaid in devalued German marks was not considered to be a taxable gain for the taxpaying company.

Decision
In a brief unanimous opinion, Justice Holmes upheld the validity of the Treasury regulations. He distinguished Bowers v. Kerbaugh-Empire Co. on the grounds that the enterprise in that case had been on the whole a failure, and had lost money. In this case, the taxpayer had made a clear and obvious gain. By paying off its debts for less than the issue price, it had freed up assets to spend on other things. Justice Holmes said nothing in his opinion about the Treasury's definition of income. Later cases before the Court did however address directly the Treasury's definition in connection with related cases.

See also
 List of United States Supreme Court cases, volume 284

References

Further reading

26 U.S.C. 108 (Section 108 of the Internal Revenue Code) and corresponding regulations, which contain the current rules on income from discharge of indebtedness.

External links

1931 in United States case law
United States Supreme Court cases
United States Supreme Court cases of the Hughes Court
United States taxation and revenue case law